Vachellia roigii is a species of plant in the family Fabaceae found only in Cuba. It is threatened by habitat loss.

References

roigii
Flora of Cuba
Critically endangered plants
Taxonomy articles created by Polbot